Alte Hehlenriede is a river of Lower Saxony, Germany.

The source of the Alte Hehlenriede is the confluence of the Abdeckereigraben and the Ausbütteler Riede south of Gifhorn.

See also
List of rivers of Lower Saxony

References

Rivers of Lower Saxony
Rivers of Germany